Lafontaine is an unincorporated community in Wilson County, Kansas, United States.  As of the 2020 census, the population of the community and nearby areas was 58.  It is located south of Fredonia and west of Neodesha.

History
Lafontaine was founded in 1879.

The Missouri Pacific Railroad was built through Lafontaine in 1886.

A post office was opened in Lafontaine in 1879, and remained in operation until it was discontinued in 1991.

Demographics

For statistical purposes, the United States Census Bureau has defined this community as a census-designated place (CDP).

References

Further reading

External links
 Wilson County maps: Current, Historic, KDOT

Unincorporated communities in Wilson County, Kansas
Unincorporated communities in Kansas